The men's snooker team tournament at the 2002 Asian Games in Busan took place from 2 to 3 October 2002 at Dongju College Gymnasium.

14 teams entered for the tournament. The teams were seeded based on their final ranking at the same event at the 1998 Asian Games in Bangkok. Chan Kwok Ming, Marco Fu and Fung Kwok Chai lifted the Snooker Team Gold in Busan on Thursday with a 2–1 win over the strong Chinese Team (Pang Weiguo, Jin Long, Ding Jun Hui) in the final. Pakistan picked up the bronze medal after beating Malaysia 3–0 in the third place play off.

Schedule
All times are Korea Standard Time (UTC+09:00)

Results

References 
2002 Asian Games Official Report, Page 286

External links 
 Official Website

Cue sports at the 2002 Asian Games